Tim Hatley is a British set and costume designer for theater and film. He is the winner of the Tony Award for Best Set Design and Best Costume Design, the Drama Desk Award for Outstanding Set Design, the Drama Desk Award for Outstanding Costume Design, and the Laurence Olivier Award for Best Set Design.

Hatley was educated at Bearwood College, Berkshire and trained in Theatre Design at Central Saint Martins College of Art and Design in London from 1986 to 1989. He has designed for Theatre de Complicite, the Royal Shakespeare Company, the Royal National Theatre, the West End, and Broadway. He has designed the costumes and/or scenic design for seven Broadway productions, both musicals and dramas, starting with Stanley in 1997 through Shrek the Musical in 2008.

Film & Theatre production design/ scenic design/ costume design

Stage Beauty 2003 (dir. Richard Eyre)
Closer 2004 (dir. Mike Nichols)
Notes on a Scandal 2006 (dir. Richard Eyre).
 
For the West End :Dreamgirls (Savoy), Travesties (Menier Chocolate Factory) Mr. Foote's Other Leg, Ibsen's Little Eyolf & Ghosts - both directed by Richard Eyre, Temple (Donmar warehouse), The Pajama Game (Chichester & West End),  costume and set designer for the musical of The Bodyguard, and Simon Gray's play Quartermaine's Terms, the original production of Monty Python musical Spamalot (2006) directed by Mike Nichols, having also done the same for Broadway. He designed sets, costumes and puppets for Shrek the Musical (Broadway, West End, UK & US Tours), sets and costumes for Betty Blue Eyes (West End 2011),  Private Lives (2001, Noël Coward Theatre) and Humble Boy (2002, Gielgud Theatre). At the National Theatre he has designed over 20 productions, including Timon of Athens, Welcome to Thebes, Rafta, Rafta..., Henry V, and Vincent in Brixton. Endgame in September 2009 (Theatre de Complicite/ West End) and Mrs Klein in October 2009 (Almeida Theatre).

Review

In May 2013, the hit musical, The Bodyguard, was staged at London’s Adelphi Theatre, the theme adapted from The Bodyguard, a 1992 film starring Whitney Houston and Kevin Costner. It was a stage musical with a cast of Heather Headley as the superstar singer Rachel Marron and Lloyd Owen as Frank Farmer, an ex-Secret Service agent turned bodyguard. The formidable task fell into the hands of the set and costume designer, Tim Hatley, along with the Director Thea Sharrock, lighting designer Mark Henderson and video designer Duncan McLean and rest of the team. Hatley turned the stage show brilliantly to glide like the real movie. “I think it's always a tricky thing having a film going onto the stage,” was what Hatley had to say about his work. The whole idea of turning a film into a musical was a big challenge for the reason that he had to keep the audience, already happy with the film, content too, maintaining the film story on one hand and avoiding bringing to stage a carbon copy. Hatley has proved himself to be a master in story telling, the theatrical way.

Exhibition Design

Vivienne Westwood- a London Fashion, at the Museum of London 
"Diaghilev and the Golden Age of the Ballets Russes" at "Victoria and Albert Museum"

Awards

 1997 Laurence Olivier Award for Best Set Design for Stanley
 2002 Tony Award for Best Scenic Design and Drama Desk Award for Private Lives
 2002 Laurence Olivier Award for Best Set Design for Humble Boy and Private Lives
 2009 Outer Critics Circle Award for Outstanding Set and Costume Design for Shrek the Musical
 2005 Tony Award for Best Scenic Design nomination for Spamalot
 2005 Tony Award for Best Costume Design nomination for Spamalot
 2009 Tony Award for Best Costume Design for Shrek the Musical
 2009 Drama Desk Award for Outstanding Set Design for Shrek the Musical
 2009 Drama Desk Award for Outstanding Costume Design for Shrek the Musical
 2011 Laurence Olivier Award for Best Costume Design nomination for Shrek the Musical
 2013 Laurence Olivier Award for Best Set Design nomination for The Bodyguard
 2014 Evening Standard Award nomination for Ghosts
 2015 Evening Standard Award nomination for Temple

References

External links
 
 
Official site
Credits

1967 births
British scenic designers
Broadway set designers
Living people
Drama Desk Award winners
Tony Award winners
Alumni of Central Saint Martins